Kuranda is a rural town and locality on the Atherton Tableland in the Shire of Mareeba, Queensland, Australia. It is surrounded by tropical rainforest and adjacent to the Wet Tropics of Queensland World Heritage listed Barron Gorge National Park.

The town of Myola is also located within the locality of Kuranda.

Geography
Kuranda is positioned on the eastern edge of the Atherton Tableland where the Barron River begins a steep descent to its coastal floodplain. The area is an important wildlife corridor between the Daintree/Carbine Tableland area in the north and Lamb Range/Atherton Tableland in the south, two centres of biodiversity.

Parts of Kuranda, particularly along its eastern edge, are protected within the Kuranda National Park and Barron Gorge National Park.  Both national parks belong to the Wet Tropics World Heritage Area.  Barron Gorge Forest Reserve and Formatine Forest Reserve have been established in the south of Kuranda.  Closer to the centre of the town is Jumrum Creek Conservation Park where a near threatened, endemic frog species Ranoidea myola is protected.  An elongated dam created by a weir built for a power station was constructed in 1935 and is used to today for recreation.

Myola is in the north of the locality beside the Barron River, upstream from the town of Kuranda.

History

The rainforest around Kuranda has been home to the Djabugay people for over 10,000 years. Europeans began to explore the area throughout the nineteenth century. It is believed a massacre of Aboriginal people took place at the location in Kuranda known as Skeleton Creek.

The name Kuranda is derived from Yindinji word, kuran referring to the acorn leafed plant (Helmholtzia acorifolia).

Djabugay (also known as Djabuganjdji, Tjupakai) is a language of Far North Queensland, particularly the area around the Kuranda Range and Barron River Catchment. The Djabugay language region includes the landscape within the local government boundaries of Cairns Regional Council.

The name Myola comes from its railway station, which was named on 15 December 1891 by the Queensland Railways Department using an Aboriginal word indicating main camp or elders' camp.

Kuranda was first settled in 1885 and surveyed by Thomas Behan in 1888. Construction of the railway from Cairns to Myola (later Cairns to Herberton) began in 1887 and the line reached Kuranda in 1891. The current railway station was completed in 1915.

Kuranda Post Office opened on 25 June 1891 (a Middle Crossing receiving office had been open from 1888).

Kuranda State School opened on 24 October 1892. It was renamed Kuranda District State School on 8 July 2002. It was at 14-22 Arara Street. In 2007, it was amalgated with Kuranda District State High School to create Kuranda District State College at the Myola site. Kuranda District State School's website was archived. The Arara Street site was purchased by the Mareeba Shire Council (now the Tablelands Regional Council) to redevelop as community facilities.

Between 1912 and 1913 Eric Mjöberg lead an expedition to Queensland in which the Kuranda Aboriginal people were observed.

Although coffee was grown around Kuranda in the early twentieth century, timber was the town's primary industry for a number of years. Kuranda has been known as a tourist destination since the early 1900s.  It was both the rainforest and local Aboriginal culture which attracted people to the area.

St Saviour's Anglican Church was built in 1915. Its colourful glass windows were added in 2002.

Clohesy River Provisional School opened on 21 August 1933 and closed in 1939.

The Barron Gorge Hydroelectric Power Station was built nearby in the 1960s.

From the 1970s onwards, Kuranda promoted itself as the 'village in the rainforest'. The concept served two purposes.  It attracted those seeking a bohemian enclave in which to reside as well as a being a tourist promotional strategy. Throughout the 1970s and 1980s Kuranda was popular with alternative lifestylers, a theme that still runs through the local community today. Tourism became the backbone of the local economy.

Kuranda Library opened in 1996 and underwent a major refurbishment in 2015.

Kuranda State High School opened on 22 January 1998 at 260 Myola Road in Myola. In 2007, Kuranda District State School and Kuranda State High School amalgamated to form Kuranda District State College, by expanding the Kuranda State High School site at Myola.  Kuranda State High School's website was archived.

Although historically and currently Kuranda is in the Shire of Mareeba, following a rationalisation of local government areas, between 2008 and 2013 all of the Shire of Mareeba was within the Tablelands Region. This unpopular decision was reversed with the reinstatement of the Shire of Mareeba in 2014.

In recent times, Kuranda remains a sleepy little tourist town, renowned for its arts and souvenir shops.

Population
According to the 2016 census of Population, there were 3,008 people in Kuranda.
 Aboriginal and Torres Strait Islander people made up 14.9% of the population. 
 67.0% of people were born in Australia. The next most common country of birth was England at 5.7%.
 80.4% of people spoke only English at home. 
 The most common response for religion was No Religion at 39.2%.

Heritage listings
Kuranda has a number of heritage-listed sites:
 Cairns-to-Kuranda railway line (operated as the Kuranda Scenic Railway) including the Kuranda railway station
 Coondoo Street: Kuranda Fig Tree Avenue

Attractions
The Skyrail Rainforest Cableway is a  scenic tourist cableway running above the Barron Gorge National Park in the Wet Tropics of Queensland’s World Heritage Area, one of the oldest tropical rainforests in the world. It operates from the Kuranda terminal at 4 Arara Street to the Smithfield terminal in Cairns.

The Kuranda Scenic Railway is a  scenic tourist railway journey through the Barron Gorge National Park from the Kuranda railway station to the Cairns railway station. A popular day trip from Cairns is the combined railway-and-cableway round trip to Kuranda.

Coondoo Street is Kuranda's main street with shops, galleries and various old and shadowy trees. St. Saviour's Anglican Church at 7 Coondoo Street is known for its colourful glass windows. The gardens surrounding  St Christopher's Catholic Church in Barang Street and the Seventh Day Adventist Church in Barron Falls Road are good locations to observe tropical birds. In the northern part of Kuranda close to Therwine Street a Japanese plane wreck can be seen in the bushes.

The Kuranda Koala Garden is a small local wildlife park which keeprs  koalas, wombats, kangaroos, wallabies, pademelons, bettongs, potoroos, bilbies, bandicoots, possums, gliders, frogmouth owls, freshwater crocodiles, lizards, pythons, turtles and frogs.

Amenities 
Mareeba Shire Council operate a public library in Kuranda at 18-22 Arara Street.

The Kuranda Historical Society was established in 2017 and seeks to collect and display items of historical interest relating to the Kuranda area.

The Kuranda Media Association publish a monthly newspaper called "The Kuranda Paper".

The Kuranda branch of the Queensland Country Women's Association meets at the CWA Hall on the corner of Barang Street and Thongon Street.

St Christopher's Catholic Church is at 20 Barang Street. It is within the Kuranda Parish of the Roman Catholic Diocese of Cairns and is administered from the Atherton Parish.

Education 
Kuranda District State College is a government primary and secondary (Prep-12) school for boys and girls at 260 Myola Road. In 2017, the school had an enrolment of 366 students with 37 teachers (33 full-time equivalent) and 32 non-teaching staff (21 full-time equivalent). It has a special education program.

Cairns Hinterland Steiner School is a private primary and secondary (Prep-11) school for boys and girls at 46 Boyles Road. In 2017, the school had an enrolment of 165 students with 18 teachers (17 full-time equivalent) and 17 non-teaching staff (11 full-time equivalent).

Fauna
The nocturnal frog species Litoria myola is only found in the vicinity of a few creeks near Kuranda. The area boasts a rich diversity of invertebrate fauna including Australia's largest species of mantids, phasmids, spiders, moths and butterflies all found in Kuranda.

Weather
Being situated in the tropics, Kuranda experiences only mild variations in temperature and its seasons consist of a dry season and a wet season.

Kuranda does not have an official weather station; however, rainfall data has been taken for many years at Kuranda Railway station and reported to the Bureau of Meteorology. Additionally various unofficial Personal Weather Stations exist in the area.

Generally Kuranda is 2–5 °C cooler than Cairns, it has more rainy days as a result of orographic influences, and it is more humid generally (with residential areas in Kuranda village averaging 90% relative humidity, because of the surrounding rain-forest). Kuranda is often referred to the "air conditioned suburb of Cairns" and the rain-forest and elevation is responsible in part for these perceptions. It is rare for the temperature to exceed 31 °C in summer, the weather being moderated by rain and cloud cover in January to March (the wet season), and night minimums at this time of year similarly rarely drop below 20 °C. Winter maximums (June to August) are typically a consistent 25 °C; however, minimums can drop to 8 °C, owing to clear skies at this time of year and cooler air movements originating from the southern Atherton Tablelands.

Government
Kuranda is located in the (federal) Australian House of Representatives Division of Leichhardt, the Legislative Assembly of Queensland Electoral district of Barron River and locally, in the Shire of Mareeba.

References

External links

 
 Town map of Kuranda, 1980
Kuranda - Village in the Rainforest
Track in the forest - The Sydney Morning Herald: Traveller

Towns in Queensland
Populated places in Far North Queensland
1888 establishments in Australia
Populated places established in 1888
Localities in Queensland